Daeguia is a genus in the phylum Pseudomonadota (Bacteria).

Etymology
The name Daeguia derives from: New Latin Daeguia, pertaining to Daegu, the location of the textile dye works from which the type strain of the type species was isolated. The genus contains a single species,  D. caeni (Yoon et al. 2008,  (type species of the genus) from Latin caeni, of sludge)

See also
 Bacterial taxonomy
 Microbiology

References 

Bacteria genera
Hyphomicrobiales
Monotypic bacteria genera